Hlas Česko Slovenska (Czech and Slovak for The Czech / Slovak Voice, literally The Voice of Czecho Slovakia) is a reality singing competition and version of The Voice of Holland for Czech Republic and Slovakia.  It is part of the international syndication The Voice based on the reality singing competition launched in the Netherlands, created by Dutch television producer John de Mol. It kicked off on February 12, 2012, and ended on June 3, 2012.
One of the important premises of the show is the quality of the singing talent. Four coaches, themselves popular performing artists, train the talents in their group and occasionally perform with them. Talents are selected in blind auditions, where the coaches cannot see, but only hear the auditioner.

Overview

Coaches and Finalists
 – Winning Coach/Contestant. Winners are in bold, eliminated contestants in small font.
 – Runner-Up Coach/Contestant. Final contestant first listed.
 – 2nd Runner-Up Coach/Contestant. Final contestant first listed.

Format 
The series consists of three phases: a blind audition, a battle phase, and live performance shows. Four judges/coaches, all noteworthy recording artists, choose teams of contestants through a blind audition process. Each judge has the length of the auditioner's performance (about one minute) to decide if he or she wants that singer on his or her team; if two or more judges want the same singer (as happens frequently), the singer has the final choice of coach.
Each team of singers is mentored and developed by its respective coach. In the second stage, called the battle phase, coaches have two of their team members battle against each other directly by singing the same song together, with the coach choosing which team member to advance from each of four individual "battles" into the first live round. Within that first live round, the surviving acts from each team again compete head-to-head, with a combination of public and jury vote deciding who advances onto the next round.
In the final phase, the remaining contestants (top 8) compete against each other in live broadcasts. The television audience and the coaches have equal say 50/50 in deciding who moves on to the final 4 phase. With one team member remaining for each coach, the (final 4) contestants compete against each other in the finale with the outcome decided solely by public vote.

The first season started on February 12, 2012, and is aired simultaneously in both countries. The judges are Josef Vojtek, leadsinger of Czech rock band Kabát, 1980s cult figure Michal David, pop singer Dara Rolins and her spouse, popular hip hop/R'n'B artist and sex symbol Rytmus.

The Blind Auditions

Episode 1: February 12, 2012

Episode 2: February 19, 2012 

This was a guest appearance by the famous singer who was playing a trick on the coaches finding out if they would recognise him. While every coach pushed the button immediately, he did not chose any of them as he was not really auditioning for the show.

Episode 3: February 26, 2012

Episode 4: March 4, 2012

Episode 5: March 11, 2012

The Battles

Coaches begin narrowing down the playing field by training the contestants with the help of "trusted advisors". Each episode featured eight to ten battles consisting two of pairings from within each team, and each battle concluding with the respective coach eliminating one of the two contestants. After that the seven winners had to go through one sing-off before six of them advanced to the live shows.

 – Battle Winner

Episode 6: 18 March 2012

Episode 7: 25 March 2012

Episode 8: 1 April 2012

The Sing-off
Each coach nominates 5 acts from their group to advance to the live shows. The 2 remaining acts per group will do a sing-off for the remaining live show spot.

The Live Shows

Episodes 9 & 10: April 8 and April 9, 2012

Team Josef and Team Rytmus performed. 
Public voted and selected their top 2 in each team. These 2 contestants are safe and advancing to the next round. Then the coaches saved another 2 contestants and the remaining ones had to sing again for their place in the competition. They sang the same songs as they did the night before. One of them was saved by the coach and the other had to leave the competition.
 Team: Team Josef, Team Rytmus

Competition Performances

Episodes 11 & 12: April 15 and April 16, 2012

Team Dara and Team Michal performed. 
Public voted and selected their top 2 in each team. These 2 contestants are safe and advancing to the next round. Then the coaches saved another 2 contestants and the remaining ones had to sing again for their place in the competition. They sang the same songs as they did the night before. One of them was saved by the coach and the other had to leave the competition.
 Team: Team Dara, Team Michal

Competition Performances

Episodes 13 & 14: April 22 and April 23, 2012

Team Josef and Team Rytmus performed. 
Public voted and selected their top 2 in each team. These 2 contestants are safe and advancing to the next round. Then the coaches saved another 1 contestant and the remaining ones had to sing again for their place in the competition. They sang the other songs as they did the night before. One of them was saved by the coach and the other had to leave the competition.
 Team: Team Josef, Team Rytmus

Competition Performances

Sing-Off Performances

Episodes 15 & 16: April 29 and April 30, 2012

Team Dara and Team Michal performed. 
Public voted and selected their top 2 in each team. These 2 contestants are safe and advancing to the next round. Then the coaches saved another  contestant and the remaining ones had to sing again for their place in the competition. They sang the other songs as they did the night before. One of them was saved by the coach and the other had to leave the competition.
 Team: Team Dara, Team Michal

Competition Performances

Sing-Off Performance

Episodes 17 & 18: May 6 and May 7, 2012

Team Josef and Team Rytmus performed. 
Public voted and selected their top 2 in each team. These 2 contestants are safe and advancing to the next round. The remaining ones had to sing again for their place in the competition. They sang the other songs as they did the night before. One of them was saved by the coach and the other had to leave the competition.
 Team: Team Josef, Team Rytmus

Competition Performances

Sing-Off Performances

Episodes 19 & 20: May 13 and May 14, 2012

Team Dara and Team Michal performed. 
Public voted and selected their top 2 in each team. These 2 contestants are safe and advancing to the next round. The remaining ones had to sing again for their place in the competition. They sang another songs as they did the night before. One of them was saved by the coach and the other had to leave the competition.
 Team: Team Dara, Team Michal

Competition Performances

Sing-Off Performances

Episode 21: May 21, 2012

Every Team performed. 
Public voted and selected their top 1 in each team. These 1 contestant is safe and advancing to the semi-final round. The remaining ones had to sing again for their place in the competition. They sang the other songs as they did the night before. One of them was saved by the coach and the other had to leave the competition.
 Team: Team Josef, Team Rytmus, Team Dara, Team Michal
Competition Performances

Sing-Off Performances

Episode 22 and 23: May 27 and May 28, 2012

Every Team performed. 
Public and coaches voted and selected their top 1 in each team. These 1 contestant is safe and advancing to the final round. Other had to leave the competition.
 Team: Team Josef, Team Rytmus, Team Dara, Team Michal
Competition Performances

Episode 24: June 9, 2012

Every Team performed. 
Public voted and selected their winner.
 Team: Team Josef, Team Rytmus, Team Dara, Team Michal
Competition Performances

Results summary of live shows

Overall
Color key:
Artist's info

See also
The Voice (TV series)

References

External links
Hlas Česko Slovenska Official Czech website
Hlas Česko Slovenska Official Slovak website

Czech Slovak
2012 Czech television seasons
2012 Slovak television seasons
Slovak reality television series
Czech reality television series
2012 Czech television series endings
2012 Slovak television series endings